Liberal Republic (Spanish, República Liberal) is the period of  Chilean history between 1861 and 1891. It is characterized by the rise of the liberal political faction the Pipiolos who opposed the Pelucones who had dominated the preceding period known as the Conservative Republic. They promulgated constitutional reforms that limited the power of the president and increased the power of the Congress.

See also
Chincha Islands War
Occupation of Araucanía
War of the Pacific

References

1861 establishments in Chile